Rolls-Royce produced a range of piston engine types for aircraft use in the first half of the 20th century. Production of own-design engines ceased in 1955 with the last versions of the Griffon; licensed production of Teledyne Continental Motors general aviation engines was carried out by the company in the 1960s and 1970s.

Examples of Rolls-Royce aircraft piston engine types remain airworthy today with many more on public display in museums.

WWI
In 1915, the Eagle, Falcon, and  Hawk engines were developed in response to wartime needs. The Eagle was very successful, especially for bombers.  It was scaled down by a factor of 5:4 to make the Falcon or by deleting one bank of its V12 cylinders to make the Hawk. The smaller engines were intended for fighter aircraft. Subsequently, it was enlarged to make the Condor which saw use in airships.

Inter-war years
 
The Kestrel was a post-war redesign of the Eagle featuring wet cylinder liners in (two) common cylinder blocks.  It was developed into the supercharged Peregrine and later the Goshawk.

Developed concurrently with the Kestrel was the unusual Rolls-Royce Eagle XVI X engine that was cancelled in favour of the Kestrel despite performing well on the test stand.

The Buzzard was an enlargement of the Kestrel  of Condor size, developed in its most extreme form into the Rolls-Royce R racing engine used for the Schneider Trophy competition.

The Vulture of 1939 was essentially two Peregrines on a common crankshaft in an X-24 configuration, both of these types being deemed unsuccessful.

WWII and beyond
The Rolls-Royce Merlin, and later the development of the Buzzard, the Rolls-Royce Griffon were the two most successful designs for Rolls-Royce to serve in the Second World War, the Merlin powering RAF fighters the Hawker Hurricane, Supermarine Spitfire, fighter/bomber de Havilland Mosquito, Lancaster and Halifax heavy bombers and also allied aircraft such as the American P-51 Mustang and some marks of Kittyhawk.

Experimental engines were developed as alternatives for high performance aircraft such as the H-24 configuration Rolls-Royce Eagle 22, the two-stroke Rolls-Royce Crecy and the Rolls-Royce Pennine and Rolls-Royce Exe, the Exe being the only one of these last three engines to fly.   However the successful development of the Merlin and Griffon, and the introduction of jet engines precluded significant production of these types.

Production of Rolls-Royce designed aircraft piston engines ceased in 1955 with the last variants of the Griffon. Between 1961 and 1981 Rolls-Royce was licensed to build the Teledyne Continental range of light aircraft piston engines including the Continental O-520.

Survivors
As of 2017 examples of the Falcon, Griffon, Kestrel and Merlin remain airworthy.

Engines on display
Various types of Rolls-Royce aircraft piston engines are on public display at the following museums:
Fleet Air Arm Museum
Imperial War Museum Duxford
Lone Star Flight Museum
Midland Air Museum
Royal Air Force Museum Cosford
Royal Air Force Museum London
Science Museum (London)
Shuttleworth Collection

Chronological list

 
 Rolls-Royce Eagle (V-12)
 Rolls-Royce Hawk
 Rolls-Royce Falcon
 Rolls-Royce Condor
 Rolls-Royce Eagle XVI (X-16)
 Rolls-Royce Kestrel
 Rolls-Royce Buzzard
 Rolls-Royce Goshawk
 Rolls-Royce R
 Rolls-Royce Peregrine
 Rolls-Royce Merlin
 Rolls-Royce Exe
 Rolls-Royce Vulture
 Rolls-Royce Crecy
 Rolls-Royce Griffon
 Rolls-Royce Eagle (H-24)
 Rolls-Royce Pennine

See also

References

Notes

Bibliography

 Gunston, Bill. World Encyclopedia of Aero Engines. Cambridge, England. Patrick Stephens Limited, 1989. 
 Nahum, A., Foster-Pegg, R.W., Birch, D. The Rolls-Royce Crecy, Rolls-Royce Heritage Trust. Derby, England. 1994 
 Lumsden, Alec. British Piston Engines and their Aircraft. Marlborough, Wiltshire: Airlife Publishing, 2003. .
 Rubbra, A.A. Rolls-Royce Piston Aero Engines - a designer remembers: Historical Series no 16 :Rolls-Royce Heritage Trust, 1990.

Further reading
 Bill Gunston, Development of Piston Aero Engines. Cambridge, England. Patrick Stephens Limited, 2006. 
 Bill Gunston, Rolls-Royce Aero Engines, Patrick Stephens Limited (Haynes Group) 
 Sir Stanley Hooker, Not Much of an Engineer, Airlife Publishing, 
 Pugh, Peter. The Magic of a Name - The Rolls-Royce Story - The First 40 Years. Cambridge, England. Icon Books Ltd, 2000.

External links

Rolls-Royce Heritage Trust
"From Eagle to Merlin" a 1939 Flight article